The following is a list of newspapers owned by Berkshire Hathaway:
 The Bryan-College Station Eagle
 The Buffalo News
 Culpeper Star-Exponent
 The Daily Progress
 Danville Register & Bee
 Dothan Eagle
 The Free Lance–Star
 Independent Tribune
 Martinsville Bulletin
 The McDowell News
 The Morning News
 The News & Advance
 The News Herald, North Carolina
 The News Virginian
 Omaha World-Herald
 Opelika-Auburn News
 The Press of Atlantic City
 The Reidsville Review
 Richmond Times-Dispatch
 The Roanoke Times
 Statesville Record & Landmark
 Tulsa World
 Waco Tribune-Herald
 Winston-Salem Journal

Berkshire Hathaway
Berkshire Hathaway